Solute carrier family 22 member 13 is a protein that in humans is encoded by the SLC22A13 gene.

Function

This gene encodes a member of the organic-cation transporter family. It is located in a gene cluster with another member of the family, organic cation transporter like 4. The encoded protein is a transmembrane protein involved in the transport of small molecules. This protein can function to mediate urate uptake and is a high affinity nicotinate exchanger in the kidneys and the intestine.

References

Further reading 

Solute carrier family